Smederevo Airfield ( / Aerodrom Smederevo)  is an aerodrome in village Lipe, on the territory of the city of Smederevo, Serbia. It is about 4.5 km southeast of the center of Smederevo, near the road 14 that connects Smederevo–Kovin. Activities include sport and training flights of aircraft, agricultural airplanes, helicopters, and  parachuting. Within the airport works and Aero Club Smederevo.

There is a concrete apron of 20x40 m.

See also 
List of airports in Serbia

Airports in Serbia